Mali Zvornik is a town and municipality located in the Mačva District of western Serbia. In 2011, the population of the town is 4,132, while the population of the municipality is 11,987. It lays opposite of the Drina river from the town of Zvornik, in Bosnia and Herzegovina. Also, a border crossing between Serbia and Bosnia and Herzegovina is located in the town.

History

There are traces of human life from Bronze Age in this area, as well as traces from the time of Roman Empire. Ancient Roman settlement Ad Drinum existed somewhere at this location. In the Middle Ages,  Mali Zvornik was one of the main mining centres of the Serbian state.

On Orlovine Hill near Mali Zvornik there are remains of the large Medieval fortress that was probably built in the first half of the 15th century, in the time of the Serbian Despotate. During the Ottoman rule, this area was part of the Pashaluk of Bosnia.

Until 1878 it was the only Bosnian municipality on the right side of river Drina, when it eventually became part of the independent Kingdom of Serbia. In the end of 19th and beginning of the 20th century, population of Mali Zvornik numbered 115 houses. The municipality of Mali Zvornik was officially established in 1955.

Settlements
Aside from the town of Mali Zvornik, the municipality includes the following settlements:

 Amajić
 Brasina
 Budišić
 Culine
 Čitluk
 Donja Borina
 Donja Trešnjica
 Radalj
 Sakar
 Velika Reka
 Voljevci

Demographics

According to the 2011 census results, the municipality of Mali Zvornik has 12,482 inhabitants.

Ethnic groups
The municipality of Mali Zvornik has many ethnic groups, with Serbs forming the majority in all settlements. The ethnic composition of the municipality of Mali Zvornik:

Economy
The following table gives a preview of total number of employed people per their core activity (as of 2017):

Gallery

Notable people
 Časlav Klonimirović, Prince of the Serbs from 927. until his death in 960.
 Stefan Dragutin, King of Serbia from 1276. to 1282.
 Avdo Karabegović, (1878-1908) Serbian poet 
 Dušan Proroković, politician, former member of Serbian parliament
 Milisav Petković, politician, former member of Serbian parliament
 Nenad Milkić, Serbian writer 
 Miloš Gajić, Partisan 
 Milinko Pantić, football player and coach 
 Miloš Vasić, rower, member of Serbian Olympics team on summer Olympics in London 2012 and Rio de Janeiro 2016 
 Predrag Rogan, football coach
 Đorđe Despotović, football player
 Nemanja Stevanović, football player
 Edin Rustemović, football player
 Filip Erić, football player
 Slaviša Radović, football player
 Oliver Stević, basketball player
 Aleksandar Todorović, basketball player

See also
 Mačva District
 Podrinje

References

External links
 Official website

Populated places in Mačva District
Municipalities and cities of Šumadija and Western Serbia
Bosnia and Herzegovina–Serbia border crossings